Intsia is a genus of flowering plants in the family Fabaceae.

Selected species
 Intsia acuminata Merr. (the Philippines)
 Intsia bijuga (Colebr.) Kuntze (Southeast Asia, Pacific Islands)
 Intsia moeleri Veill. 
 Intsia palembanica Miq.

References

External links

 
Fabaceae genera
Taxonomy articles created by Polbot